Vånga is a locality situated in Norrköping Municipality, Östergötland County, Sweden with 220 inhabitants in 2010. Vånga lies north of Lake Roxen.

References 

Populated places in Östergötland County
Populated places in Norrköping Municipality